The Roman Catholic Archdiocese of Tucumán is in Argentina and is a metropolitan diocese. Its suffragan sees include Añatuya, Concepción and Santiago del Estero.

History
On 15 February 1897 Pope Leo XIII founded the Diocese of Tucumán from territory taken from the Diocese of Salta.  Pope Pius XII elevated it to an archdiocese on 11 February 1957.  It lost territory to the Diocese of Concepción when it was created in 1963.

Bishops

Ordinaries
Pedro Miguel Argandoña Pastene Salazar (1744–1762)
Pablo Padilla y Bárcena (1898–1921)
Barnabé Piedrabuena (1923–1928)
Agustín Barrere, F.M.I. (1930–1952)
Juan Carlos Aramburu (1953–1967), appointed Coadjutor Archbishop of Buenos Aires; future Cardinal
Blas Victorio Conrero (1968–1982)
Horacio Alberto Bózzoli (1983–1993)
Raúl Arsenio Casado (1994–1999)
Luis Héctor Villalba (1999–2011) (Cardinal in 2015)
Alfredo Zecca (2011–2017)
Carlos Alberto Sánchez (2017–present)

Coadjutor archbishop
Carlos José Ñáñez (1995-1998), did not succeed to the see; appointed Archbishop of Córdoba

Auxiliary bishops
Barnabé Piedrabuena (1907-1910), appointed Bishop of Catamarca (later returned here as Bishop)
Carlos Echenique Altamira (1914-1922)
Juan Carlos Aramburu (1946-1953), appointed Bishop here; future Cardinal

Other priests of this diocese who became bishops
Luis Urbanč, appointed Coadjutor Bishop of Catamarca in 2006
José Melitón Chávez, appointed  Bishop of Añatuya in 2015

Territorial losses

References

Roman Catholic dioceses in Argentina
Roman Catholic Ecclesiastical Province of Tucumán
Religious organizations established in 1897
Roman Catholic dioceses and prelatures established in the 19th century